Through Fire and Water is a 1923 British silent adventure film directed by Thomas Bentley and starring Clive Brook, Flora le Breton and Lawford Davidson. It was based on the 1922 novel Greensea Island by Victor Bridges.

Cast
 Clive Brook as John Dryden
 Flora le Breton as Christine de Rhoda
 Lawford Davidson as Dr. Manning
 Jerrold Robertshaw as Jennaway
 M. A. Wetherell as Craill
 Teddy Arundell as Bascomb
 Esme Hubbard as Mrs. Craill
 Ian Wilson as Jimmy

References

External links
 

1923 films
British adventure films
British silent feature films
1920s English-language films
Films directed by Thomas Bentley
1923 adventure films
Films based on British novels
Ideal Film Company films
British black-and-white films
Silent adventure films
1920s British films